The Karen Blixen Museum, located 10 km outside of Nairobi, Kenya, "at the foot of the Ngong Hills", is the former African home of Danish author Karen Blixen, famous for her 1937 book Out of Africa which chronicles life at the estate.

History
Located in what was then British East Africa, the bungalow-style house which is now the Karen Blixen Museum was built in 1912 by the Swedish engineer Åke Sjögren, The house and its attached property were bought in 1917 by Karen Blixen and her husband, Baron Bror von Blixen-Finecke with the intention of operating a coffee plantation. After the Blixens separated in 1921, Karen Blixen continued to live at the house and run the plantation until she returned to Denmark 1931 for good. Her life here is chronicled in her most famous book, Out of Africa, as well as in her book Shadows on the Grass.

After Blixen's death in 1962, the house was donated by the Danish government in 1964 to the new Kenyan government as an independence gift and was opened to the public in 1986 as one of Kenya's national museums, following the popularity of the 1985 movie, Out of Africa. However, this site was not where the Out of Africa was filmed, as the pictures were taken in Blixen's first farmhouse, Mbagathi, nearby, where she lived between 1914 and 1917. Nowadays the museum is situated in the upscale Nairobi suburb named "Karen," which was created by the land re-parceling of the coffee farm, after Blixen's return to Denmark.

The Karen Blixen Museum is open every day between 09:30 and 18:00, including on weekends and public holidays. Visitors have the opportunity to take part in continuously offered guided tours of the house, which features rooms designed in both the original decor and with props from the 1985 film. The grounds, which feature original equipment from the coffee farm, are also available for touring. There is also a gift shop. The grounds of the museum are available to rent for weddings, corporate functions, and other events.

Notes

External links
 Museum Shop
 Museum website, Kenya

Houses in Kenya
Biographical museums in Kenya
Buildings and structures in Nairobi
Women's museums
Buildings and structures associated with the Dinesen family
Karen Blixen
Tourist attractions in Nairobi
History of women in Kenya